Sedov is a rural locality (a khutor) in Krasnyanskoye Rural Settlement, Kumylzhensky District, Volgograd Oblast, Russia. The population was 155 as of 2010.

Geography 
Sedov is located in forest steppe, on Khopyorsko-Buzulukskaya Plain, on the right bank of the Medveditsa River, 53 km south of Kumylzhenskaya (the district's administrative centre) by road. Krasnyansky is the nearest rural locality.

References 

Rural localities in Kumylzhensky District